FC Anyang (Hangul: FC 안양) is a South Korean professional football club based in Anyang that competes in the K League 2, the second tier of South Korean football. Founded in 2013, they play their home games at Anyang Stadium.

Players

Current squad

Out on loan

Season-by-season records

References

External links 

  

 
K League 2 clubs
Anyang
Anyang, Gyeonggi
Anyang
Anyang